William Ross Maples, Ph.D. (1937–1997) was an American forensic anthropologist working at the C.A. Pound Human Identification Laboratory at the Florida Museum of Natural History. His specialty was the study of bones. He worked on several high-profile criminal investigations, including those concerning historical figures such as Francisco Pizarro, the Romanov family, Joseph Merrick (known as the "Elephant Man"), President Zachary Taylor and Medgar Evers. His insights often proved beneficial in closing cases that otherwise may have remained unsolved.

He is the author of Dead Men Do Tell Tales: The  Unusual and Fascinating Cases of a Forensic Anthropologist (co-authored by Michael Browning). The book chronicles his career in forensic anthropology and some of his high-profile cases.

Personal life
Maples married Margaret Kelly in 1958. They had two children, Lisa and Cynthia. Maples completed his doctorate at the University of Texas at Austin in 1967. On February 27, 1997, he died at his home in Gainesville, Florida, from a cancerous brain tumor.

References

 Maples, William R. and Browning, Michael (1994). Dead Men Do Tell Tales. Existe versión en español "Los muertos también hablan" (2006)

External links
 C.A. Pound Human Identification Laboratory
 The William R. Maples Center for Forensic Medicine
 The William R. Maples Collection Digital Collection of William R. Maples works, documents, photos and research. Maintained by the Florida Gulf Coast University Library.

1937 births
1997 deaths
Deaths from cancer in Florida
Deaths from brain cancer in the United States
University of Florida faculty
Forensic anthropologists
20th-century American anthropologists